Parveen Hassan is a Conservative women's organiser in the UK.

She is honoured in BBC'S 100 Women in 2013.

References 

Year of birth missing (living people)
Living people
BBC 100 Women